Normand Lacombe (born October 18, 1964) is a Canadian former professional ice hockey right wing.  He was drafted in the first round, 10th overall, by the Buffalo Sabres in the 1983 NHL Entry Draft.

Playing career 
Lacombe was born in Montreal, Quebec and raised in Pierrefonds, Quebec. As a youth, he played in the 1977 Quebec International Pee-Wee Hockey Tournament with a minor ice hockey team from North Shore. After playing two seasons at the University of New Hampshire, Lacombe made his professional debut with Buffalo's American Hockey League affiliate, the Rochester Americans, in the 1983–84 season.  Lacombe made his National Hockey League debut with the Sabres during the 1984–85 season, playing in 30 games.  He appeared in 64 more games with the Sabres over the next two seasons before being traded, along with Wayne Van Dorp, to the Edmonton Oilers in exchange for Lee Fogolin and Mark Napier.

Lacombe was a member of the Oilers team which won the Stanley Cup in the 1987–88 season, and had the finest statistical season of his career in the 1988–89 season (17 goals, 11 assists).  The Oilers traded Lacombe to the Philadelphia Flyers, where he would spend the final season-plus of his career, during the 1989–90 season.

In his NHL career, Lacombe appeared in 319 games.  He scored 53 goals and added 62 assists.  He also played in 26 playoff games, all with Edmonton, scoring five goals and tallying one assist.

Coaching career 
Lacombe was the head coach of the AJHL St. Albert Steel at the start of the 2007–08 season, but was fired shortly into the year and replaced by General Manager Greg Parks. He became the head coach of the Whitecourt Wolverines of the North West Junior Hockey League in the middle of the 2011–12 season, where he led the team to a league record fourth consecutive championship. In the off-season, the team folded to make way for the successor Whitecourt Wolverines of the Alberta Junior Hockey League, for which he is now the team's strength and conditioning coach.

Awards and achievements

1987–88 - NHL - Stanley Cup (Edmonton)

Career statistics

References

External links
 

1964 births
Living people
Buffalo Sabres draft picks
Buffalo Sabres players
Canadian ice hockey right wingers
Edmonton Oilers players
Ice hockey people from Montreal
National Hockey League first-round draft picks
New Hampshire Wildcats men's ice hockey players
Nova Scotia Oilers players
People from Pierrefonds-Roxboro
Philadelphia Flyers players
Rochester Americans players
Stanley Cup champions